Wyczółki  is a village in the administrative district of Gmina Sochaczew, within Sochaczew County, Masovian Voivodeship, in east-central Poland.

The village has a population of 130.

References

Villages in Sochaczew County